The Second Perrottet ministry or Second Perrottet–Toole ministry is the 99th ministry of the Government of New South Wales, and is led by Dominic Perrottet, the state's 46th Premier.

The Liberal–National coalition ministry was formed on 21 December 2021 from a reshuffle, the first time since Perrottet and Paul Toole were elected as Liberal Party leader and National Party leader respectively in October 2021. The Parliament of New South Wales considers the reshuffled ministry to be a separate and new ministry from the previous Perrottet ministry before the reshuffle.

Composition of ministry
The composition of the ministry was announced by Premier Perrottet and sworn in on 21 December 2021. On 18 December 2021, Don Harwin and Shelley Hancock announced that they opted not to be considered in the new ministry due to personal reasons. Also that day, Nationals minister Melinda Pavey was notified by Deputy Premier and Nationals leader Toole that she would be dropped from the new ministry. The reshuffle was announced the following day on 19 December 2021 and confirmed that Adam Marshall was also dropped from the ministry. There were nine new ministers appointed to the cabinet and three new portfolios created, which were Cities, Science, Innovation and Technology, and Homes. There were also seven women in the new cabinet, one more than the second Berejiklian ministry. The ministry increased from 21 to 26 ministers. The new cabinet was sworn in on 21 December 2021.

During the New South Wales floods in 2022, on 4 March, Perrottet announced that Minister for Emergency Services and Resilience Steph Cooke would be additionally appointed Minister for Flood Recovery to oversee the flood recovery. As Perrottet and Cooke were in Ballina during the announcement, Cooke could not be sworn in that day and would have to return Sydney first in order to be sworn in. She was eventually sworn in on 9 March 2022.

Eleni Petinos was sacked on 31 July 2022 (but was only officially removed from office on 3 August 2022) and Stuart Ayres resigned four days later. Victor Dominello took over Petinos' portfolios on 3 August 2022. On 5 August 2022, Alister Henskens was additionally appointed Minister for Enterprise, Investment and Trade, and Minister for Sport, Ben Franklin was additionally appointed Minister for Tourism, and David Elliott was additionally appointed Minister for Western Sydney.

In the order of seniority:

 
Ministers are members of the Legislative Assembly unless otherwise noted.

See also

Members of the New South Wales Legislative Assembly, 2019–2023
Members of the New South Wales Legislative Council, 2019–2023

Notes and references

Notes

References 

 

! colspan=3 style="border-top: 5px solid #cccccc" | New South Wales government ministries

New South Wales ministries
2021 establishments in Australia
Lists of current office-holders in Australia
Ministries established in 2021